Kermit Cintrón (born October 22, 1979) is a Puerto Rican former professional boxer and online boxing writer. He held the IBF welterweight title from 2006 to 2008, and has challenged once for the WBC super welterweight title in 2011.

Early and personal life
Cintrón had a difficult childhood. He witnessed his mother lie in bed for months before she died of cancer. Unable to care for Cintrón and his siblings, Cintrón's father sent him to the United States, with Cintrón's uncle, Benjamin Serrano, a former Middleweight contender who had fought Frank Fletcher. Cintrón's father remained in regular contact with his children but when Cintrón was 13 his father died of a heart attack, leaving him and his siblings orphaned. 

As a child, Cintrón took up wrestling and boxing. While attending William Tennent High School in Warminster, Pennsylvania, he became an accomplished high-school wrestler on the same team as actor Mike Vogel. After competing at William Tennent, Cintron wrestled at Thaddeus Stevens College of Technology, a junior college in Lancaster, Pennsylvania.

In early 2008, Cintrón was trained by Emanuel Steward, who focused his training in boxing and counterattacks.  He decided to finish this partnership, based on the fact that Steward's time was limited due to several other compromises. Despite this, both conserved a close friendship. During this timeframe, Cintrón abandoned Main Events, signing a promotional contract with Lou DiBella. His next trainer was Ronnie Shields, who emphasized on a faster training pace. Shields preferred a more aggressive style, reminiscent of the one presented during the early stage of Cintrón's early career. Brian Caldwell was employed as conditioning coach, in the process modifying his weight routines.

Cintrón is married to María Cintrón and the couple have three children. Two daughters, Denali and Savannah and a son, Clemente.

Boxing career

Welterweight
Cintrón did not start boxing in the amateurs until he was 19. He compiled a record of 24 wins and 5 losses as an amateur.

On October 7, 2000, Cintrón knocked out Jesse Williams in two rounds in Lancaster to begin his professional career. Cintrón thus began an undefeated streak that would last for more than three-and-a-half years.

One of his toughest tests during that streak came against Omar Davila on February 16, 2002. Cintrón took the fight on one week's notice and traveled to his opponent's hometown of San Antonio. Despite being cut on the side of one of his eyes in the first round, Cintrón overcame adversity, coming back to defeat Davila by knockout in round two.

Cintrón was featured on NBC on May 18, 2003, against Puerto Rican veteran Luis Rosario, and he won by knockout 59 seconds into round one.

On July 17, 2004, Cintrón made his HBO Boxing debut, knocking out Teddy Reid in eight rounds.

KO Magazine featured Cintrón in an article, which compared his punching power to that of Félix Trinidad and Thomas Hearns.

Still undefeated and now considered a rising star in the division, Cintrón was scheduled for his first world title bout against WBO welterweight champion Antonio Margarito on April 23, 2005, as part of the undercard of a Shane Mosley win by unanimous decision against the Guatemalan-American boxer David Estrada. Cintrón was dropped by Margarito four times en route to a fifth-round knockout loss.

In early 2006, Cintrón rebounded with a tenth-round technical knockout of Estrada, thus reestablishing himself as a contender in the welterweight division.

IBF welterweight champion
Cintrón then won his first title belt in a match against Mark Suarez for the IBF crown that had been vacated on June 20, 2006 by Floyd Mayweather Jr.

On July 14, 2007, Cintrón was dominant in his first title defense, knocking down Argentine Walter Matthysse three times on his way to a knockout victory twenty-nine seconds into the second round. Prior to this match, Matthysse had never been knocked down by any opponent, although he had suffered a tenth-round technical knockout in May 2006 at the hands of Paul Williams. (The Cintrón-Matthysse bout was the main undercard of a WBO title bout between challenger Williams and incumbent Margarito)

Cintrón and Williams were scheduled for an IBF/WBO title unification bout on February 2, 2008. But as a result of an injury to Cintrón's right hand sustained during his bout with Jesse Feliciano the fight has been canceled.

Cintrón lost his IBF title to Antonio Margarito by knockout on an April 12 broadcast of HBO's World Championship Boxing in a rematch from Atlantic City, NJ, on the undercard of Miguel Cotto vs. Alfonso Gómez. In the sixth round, Cintrón fell to the canvas after receiving a one-two punch to the head and a body shot and did not get up before the referee concluded the protective count.  It was the first time he had lost a professional fight by a knockout (his previous loss to Margarito being scored as a technical knockout).

Cintrón returned to action against Lovemore N'dou, competing in an eliminatory fight sanctioned by the IBF. The fight took place on November 15, 2008, in a card held in Nashville, Tennessee. Early in the fight, Cintrón began on the offensive, while N'dou clinched regularly. This pattern slowed the fight's tempo throughout the contest. In the third round, Cintrón connected a solid punch, N'dou tried to counterattack and exchange but was ineffective, eventually returning to a strategy based on holds. The numerous clinches resulted in head butts, the referee issued numerous warnings to N'dou for these, eventually deducting a point in the ninth. In the tenth round, an accidental headbutt opened a laceration over Cintrón's eyebrow. In the eleventh round, he was able to injure N'dou with a punch, but did not continue pressing the offensive. Subsequently, the judges awarded Cintrón scores of 117-110, 115-112 and 116-111.

Light middleweight
Cintrón's victory over N'dou made him Joshua Clottey's mandatory challenger. The fight was discussed and preliminary agreements scheduled it for February 21, 2009. However, after receiving a more lucrative offer, Cintrón decided to fight Sergio Martínez for the World Boxing Council's interim light middleweight championship. The bout took place on February 14, 2009, and ended in a controversial majority draw. The opening rounds held no meaningful action, with Cintrón holding an early edge due to his aggression and cleaner punching. By the fourth round, Martínez started moving around with his hands down in an effort to draw Cintrón into a mistake, but to no avail, as there continued to be more clinching than punching. Martínez opened a cut over Cintrón's left eye early in the fifth round. Late in the seventh round, a left hand to the head hurt Cintrón, and after backing into the ropes, he went down to his knees before Martínez could attack. Cintrón claimed he was headbutted while the referee Frank Santore continued the count. After Cintrón's protests and a lot of confusion in the ring, Santore allowed the bout to continue, saying Cintrón was up at nine and that he never stopped the fight. Martínez went after Cintrón once the eighth round commenced and taunted him after landing punches to the head. Cintrón responded with sustained action of his own, but it was Martínez ending the round with another left hand to the head. The ninth round was favorable for Martínez, but Cintrón rebounded in the tenth round. Martínez lost a point for a punch to the back of the head in the final round. Scores were 116-110 for Martínez and 113-113 draw.

Cintrón vs. Angulo, Williams
On May 30, 2009 Cintron defeated Alfredo Angulo, who was unbeaten, by unanimous decision. This high-profile win put Cintrón into position to fight Paul Williams, at the time one of boxing's top fighters, pound for pound. This fight took place on May 8, 2010. Although Williams had averaged over a hundred punches per round in his previous outings, Cintrón was able to neutralize his punch output over the first three rounds by effectively jabbing and countering with his right hand. This resulted in a very technical three rounds of boxing and, not surprisingly, voluminous jeers from the spectating crowd. In the fourth round, however, the combatants began to exchange punches, each landing hard power punches on one another. One such exchange caused an entanglement between the fighters, sending Williams to the canvas and Cintrón through the ropes, where he landed on a media table abutting the exterior of the ring. He then fell to the floor and was immediately attended to by ringside doctors. Boxing rules dictate that a fighter, in these circumstances, is afforded a five-minute period with which to recover; however, given that Cintrón was advised by doctors not to move, the fight was called and Cintrón was removed from the arena bound to a stretcher. Since three rounds had been completed, the fight became official and Williams was declared the winner by split decision.

On July 9, 2010, Cintrón lost a unanimous decision to Carlos Molina, who had an 18-4-2 record going into the fight.

On August 12, 2011, Cintrón won a unanimous decision over Antwone Smith.

Cintrón vs. Álvarez

On November 26, 2011, Cintrón was knocked out in five rounds by Canelo Álvarez.

Mixed martial arts career

Public challenge to Sean Sherk
In April 2007, Floyd Mayweather Jr. publicly claimed that any boxer could make the transition into mixed martial arts and win. In response, Ultimate Fighting Championship's president, Dana White, issued him a challenge to fight the promotion's lightweight champion, Sean Sherk. Mayweather later said that he did not wish to compete in the discipline. However, Cintrón stated that he was willing to fight Sherk in his place. "I want the fight," said Cintrón, who was 27-1 with 25 KOs. "I can wrestle. I can box. I can beat those UFC fighters at their own game. Tell Mr. White to make me an offer and I'll take on his guy...."

Lingering interest
Seven years later, Mike Sloan of Sherdog argued that "If Cintron [sic] would have had the opportunity to compete in MMA when he first got into boxing, he would have torn most of the lower weight divisions asunder" and "would have been a top contender in MMA." Sloan argued that his wrestling background and "ferocious banging style" represented "a dynamic combination that would have given MMA contenders all sorts of trouble" had he completed the transition in his prime.

In June 2017, Cintrón once again commented on his interest noting that he " would have loved to get into mixed martial arts. At that time I was rising in the sport of boxing, but I would have crossed to MMA if the opportunity had come. I didn't know anyone in that sport so I never proceeded with it. Never looked into it as I should have, I guess. I think I would have done great." He noted that he "would if UFC called". Latter that year, Cintrón expressed interest in accepting Conor McGregor's challenge for boxers to "come into his world" and step into the UFC octagon.

Formal transition
In November 2019, Cintrón announced that upon retiring from boxing, he would try his hand at MMA, still felling confident that his background in amateur wrestling would facilitate the transition. When queried why it took so long, he responded "[o]ne time, the name Sean Sherk came up, and I was all about it! And that kind of died out so I continued with my boxing career. I've tried! I've tried over the years to get connected to Dana White and see if I can get an opportunity but it never came about. Hopefully this happens this time around!" For this, he added 20 pounds to his frame, given the disparity of the welterweight division between sports. Cintrón also retook his wrestling training, working with an NCAA Division-1 wrestler and a former UFC fighter.

Professional boxing record

See also
List of welterweight boxing champions
List of IBF world champions
List of Puerto Rican boxing world champions

References

External links

1979 births
International Boxing Federation champions
Living people
People from Carolina, Puerto Rico
Puerto Rican male boxers
Light-middleweight boxers
World welterweight boxing champions
People from Warminster, Pennsylvania